Jayakody Aratchige Don Anthony Jayakody (born 2 October 1958, in Pamunugama, Sri Lanka) is one of the three Auxiliary Bishops of the Archdiocese of Colombo, appointed on 4 April 2018 and consecrated on 23 June 2018. He is also the Titular Bishop of Mulli.

References

Roman Catholic auxiliary bishops of Colombo
Living people
1958 births